Ematheudes punctella is a moth of the family Pyralidae described by Georg Friedrich Treitschke in 1833. It is found in southern and central Europe, Turkey and probably further east.

References

Moths described in 1833
Anerastiini
Moths of Europe
Moths of Asia